I Can't Stand It may refer to:
 "I Can't Stand It" (Eric Clapton song), 1981
I Can't Stand It (Blossoms song), 2018
 "I Can't Stand It!", a song by Twenty 4 Seven
 "I Can't Stand It", a song by The Spencer Davis Group from Their First LP
 "I Can't Stand It", a song by The Velvet Underground from VU, re-released by Lou Reed as a solo artist

See also 
 "I Can't Stand Myself (When You Touch Me)", song by James Brown